Sesame Ramen is a type of ramyeon (instant noodles) sold in South Korea that is produced by Ottogi. The contents of the ramyeon are unique; it consists of a dried noodle block, seasoning, oil, sesame, and an "egg block," which is made of egg and vegetables. It is served both in a cup and a "bag." In English, it means "sesame instant noodles."

See also
 List of noodles
 List of instant noodle brands

References

External links
 - Ottogi Food

South Korean brands
Instant noodle brands